Michael Jordan Contreras Araya (born 10 February 1993) is a Chilean footballer who currently plays for Deportes Iquique as right or left back.

Honours

Club
Deportes Iquique
 Primera B: 2010
 Copa Chile: 2010

External links
 Contreras at Football Lineups
 
 

1993 births
Living people
People from Iquique
Chilean footballers
Chile international footballers
Deportes Iquique footballers
Universidad de Chile footballers
Cobresal footballers
Everton de Viña del Mar footballers
Cobreloa footballers
Chilean Primera División players
Primera B de Chile players
Association football fullbacks